The 1914–15 Trinity Blue and White's basketball team represented Trinity College (later renamed Duke University) during the 1914–15 men's college basketball season. The head coach was Noble Clay, coaching his second season with Trinity. The team finished with an overall record of 10–10.

Schedule

|-

References

Duke Blue Devils men's basketball seasons
Duke
1914 in sports in North Carolina
1915 in sports in North Carolina